Kateryna Bondarenko was the defending champion, but chose not to participate.

Rebecca Peterson won the title, defeating Anna Tatishvili in the final, 6–3, 4–6, 6–1.

Seeds

Draw

Finals

Top half

Bottom half

References
Main Draw

USTA Tennis Classic of Macon - Doubles